Yuanshan is a town of Lianping County, Guangdong, China. , it has 5 residential communities and 15 villages under its administration. Yuanshan is located 1,737 km South of the capital Beijing.

References

Township-level divisions of Guangdong
Lianping County